USS Kemah (SP-415) was a United States Navy patrol vessel in commission from 1918 to 1919.
 
Kemah was laid down as a private motor yacht of the same name in 1917 by the Luders Marine Construction Company at Stamford, Connecticut. While she was still under construction, the U.S. Navy acquired her from her owner, F. E. Lewis II of New York City, on 7 October 1917 for use as a section patrol vessel during World War I. She was completed in 1918, brought to the New York Navy Yard in April 1918, and  commissioned there as USS Kemah (SP-415) on 16 July 1918.

Initially assigned to the 6th Naval District, Kemah was reassigned to the 3rd Naval District at New York City upon commissioning. Restricted to protected waters, Kemah served as a guard ship in New York Harbors coastal waters until she was removed from active service on 3 September 1919.

Kemah was decommissioned on 18 September 1919. She was sold to R. T. Robinson of San Diego, California, on 22 September 1919.

References

Department of the Navy Naval History and Heritage Command Online Library of Selected Images: U.S. Navy Ships: USS Kemah (SP-415), 1918-1920
NavSource Online: Section Patrol Craft Photo Archive: Kemah (SP 415)

1918 ships
Individual yachts
Patrol vessels of the United States Navy
Ships built in Stamford, Connecticut
World War I patrol vessels of the United States